Muhammad Fadli bin Kamis (born 7 November 1992) is a Singapore international footballer who plays as a defender for Singapore Premier League club Geylang International.

Club career 

Fadli started his career at S.League club Geylang International before moving to under-23 developmental side Courts Young Lions for the 2014 season. He stayed in the club for one year before moving on to Balestier Khalsa.

International career
Fadli represented Singapore U23 at the 2014 Asian Games. He made his senior international debut in the starting line-up of a friendly match against Papua New Guinea on 6 September 2014. Fadli got his second cap for the national team after five years on 8 June 2019, in the friendly against Solomon Islands. Fadli got his first start for the national team on 11 June 2019 against Myanmar.

Geylang International 
On 13 November 2021, Fadli returned to Geylang International FC.

Personal life 
Fadli has been in a relationship with popular social media influencer Rose Nayeli since mid-2017. They were engaged on 4 March 2018, and later married on 8 December 2019.

Career statistics

Club
. Caps and goals may not be correct.

International Statistics

International caps

References 

1992 births
Living people
Singaporean footballers
Singapore international footballers
Association football defenders
Geylang International FC players
Balestier Khalsa FC players
Singapore Premier League players
Young Lions FC players
Singaporean people of Malay descent
Footballers at the 2014 Asian Games
Asian Games competitors for Singapore